The 2017–18 Montenegrin First League was the 12th season of the top-tier football in Montenegro. The season began on 5 August 2017 and ended on 26 May 2018. Budućnost Podgorica are the defending champions.

The league champions earned a place in the 2018–19 Champions League first qualifying round, and the second and third placed clubs earned a place in the 2018–19 Europa League first qualifying round. Since the third-placed Mladost Podgorica won the 2017–18 Montenegrin Cup which earned them the same spot in the Europa League, the spot was taken by the fourth-placed team.

There was one new club this season, Kom, who earned promotion from the Montenegrin Second League. Bokelj, Lovćen and Jedinstvo Bijelo Polje were relegated after the 2016–17 season, as the league's contestants amount was reduced from 12 clubs to 10.

Teams

League table

Results
The ten clubs played each other four times for a total of 36 matches each.

First half of season

Second half of season

Relegation play-offs
The 10th-placed team (against the 3rd-placed team of the Second League) and the 11th-placed team (against the runners-up of the Second League) will both compete in two-legged relegation play-offs after the end of the season.

Summary

Matches

Lovćen won 2–1 on aggregate.

Petrovac won 5–2 on aggregate.

Top scorers

See also 
 Montenegrin First League
 2017–18 Montenegrin Second League

References

External links 
 UEFA

Montenegrin First League seasons
Monte
1